Jacob Taljaard (born 18 August 1965) is a South African cricketer. He played in one first-class and four List A matches for Boland between 1986/87 and 1990/91.

See also
 List of Boland representative cricketers

References

External links
 

1965 births
Living people
South African cricketers
Boland cricketers
Cricketers from Cape Town